Aleksandr Volodymyrovych Palladin (10 September 1885 – 6 December 1972) was a Ukrainian biochemist, professor and Soviet academician. He is known for establishing the Palladin Institute of Biochemistry and heading the Academy of Sciences of Ukraine in the post World War II period.

Aleksandr was born in a family of the Russian academician and biochemist Vladimir Palladin and was a student of a Russian physiologist Ivan Pavlov.

After graduating Saint Petersburg State University in 1908, next year Palladin also studied at Heidelberg University. After that during 1909-1916 he worked in several institutes in Saint Petersburg. In 1916 Palladin became a professor of Novaya Aleksandria Institute of Agrarian Business and Forestry (today Kharkiv National Agrarian University of Dokuchayev) that was relocated from Puławy in Vistula Land (Congress of Poland) to Kharkiv.

Soon after the Red Army recovered the city of Kharkiv from the White Army, in 1921 he became a head of physiological chemistry department of the Kharkiv Medical Institute (today Kharkiv National Medical University) and at the same time staying at the agrarian institute as well for few more years.

External links
 Palladin Institute of Biochemistry official website
 Aleksandr Palladin at the Kiev city Wikipedia
 Aleksandr Palladin at the Great Biographic Encyclopedia
 Biography at the National Academy of Sciences of Belarus
 Palladin at the Great Soviet Encyclopedia

1885 births
1972 deaths
People from Moskovsky Uyezd
Russians in Ukraine
Communist Party of the Soviet Union members
Second convocation members of the Supreme Soviet of the Soviet Union
Third convocation members of the Supreme Soviet of the Soviet Union
Fourth convocation members of the Supreme Soviet of the Soviet Union
Fifth convocation members of the Supreme Soviet of the Soviet Union
Soviet biochemists
Ukrainian biochemists
Saint Petersburg State University alumni
Heidelberg University alumni
Academic staff of Kharkiv National Medical University
Academic staff of the Taras Shevchenko National University of Kyiv
Presidents of the National Academy of Sciences of Ukraine
Full Members of the USSR Academy of Sciences
Academicians of the USSR Academy of Medical Sciences
Lenin Prize winners
Heroes of Socialist Labour
Recipients of the Order of Lenin
Burials at Baikove Cemetery